Yangoor is the largest known crater on the surface of the Uranian moon Ariel. The name comes from a spirit that brings day in Australian Aboriginal mythology. The northwestern edge of the crater was erased by formation of ridged terrain. The crater lacks bright ejecta deposits and was imaged for the first time by the Voyager 2 spacecraft in January 1986.

References 

Ariel (moon)
Surface features of Uranian moons